Euryphura is a butterfly genus in the subfamily Limenitidinae. The species of this genus are found in the Afrotropical realm.

Species
Listed alphabetically within species groups:
Subgenus Euryphura
The porphyrion species group
Euryphura porphyrion (Ward, 1871)
Euryphura togoensis Suffert, 1904
The achlys species group
Euryphura achlys (Hopffer, 1855)
Euryphura chalcis (C. & R. Felder, 1860)
Euryphura isuka Stoneham, 1935
Euryphura plautilla (Hewitson, 1865)
Unknown species group
Euryphura athymoides Berger, 1981
Euryphura ducarmei Hecq, 1990
Subgenus Crenidomimas Karsch, 1894
Euryphura concordia (Hopffer, 1855)

Former species
Euryphura nobilis Staudinger, 1891 is sometimes placed in its own genus, Euryphurana.

References

External links
Seitz, A. Die Gross-Schmetterlinge der Erde 13: Die Afrikanischen Tagfalter. Plate XIII 36

Limenitidinae
Nymphalidae genera
Taxa named by Otto Staudinger